Robert Linfield Bell (23 August 1929 – 16 November 2011) was a New Zealand politician of the National Party. He had a farming background and represented the Gisborne electorate in Parliament from 1975 until his defeat in 1984.

Early life
Bell was born in Blenheim in 1929. His father was Alex Linfield Bell. He received his education at Christchurch Boys' High School, Horowhenua College, and Feilding Agricultural High School. He graduated from Lincoln College in 1951 with a diploma in valuation and farm management. In 1954, he married Anne Wilkinson, the daughter of John Arthur Wilkinson, and they were to have two daughters and one son.

Professional life and community involvement
He was a farm appraiser for six years, followed by seven years as the Gisborne–East Coast representative of London Wood Brokers (NZ) Ltd. For ten years after that, he was a farm management consultant and valuer. Bell was a director of Gisborne Holdings Ltd.

Bell was a counsellor for the Gisborne Budgetary Advisory Service, a committee member of the Poverty Bay A & P Association, and a director of the YMCA in Gisborne. He served in the Territorials for six years, with the rank of lieutenant, and was appointed as a justice of the peace in 1987.

Political career

Bell joined the National Party in 1958, and was chair of the Kaiti branch from 1962 to 1978. Bell was part of the small group of National MPs that stopped Robert Muldoon driving home drunk on the night that he had called the 1984 snap election.

Bell was awarded the Queen Elizabeth II Silver Jubilee Medal in 1977, and the New Zealand 1990 Commemoration Medal.

Death
Bell died on 16 November 2011 in Tauranga, aged 82.

Notes

References

New Zealand National Party MPs
Unsuccessful candidates in the 1984 New Zealand general election
New Zealand MPs for North Island electorates
Members of the New Zealand House of Representatives
New Zealand justices of the peace
Lincoln University (New Zealand) alumni
People educated at Christchurch Boys' High School
People educated at Feilding High School
People from Blenheim, New Zealand
People from Gisborne, New Zealand
People educated at Horowhenua College
1929 births
2011 deaths